Danton was a semi-dreadnought battleship of the French Navy and the lead ship of her class. She was a technological leap in battleship development for the French Navy, as she was the first ship in the fleet with turbine engines. However, like all battleships of her type, she was completed after the Royal Navy battleship , and as such she was outclassed before she was even commissioned.

During her career Danton was sent to Great Britain to honor the coronation of George V, and later served in World War I as an escort for supply ships and troop transports, guarding them from elements of the German Navy. While en route to aid a blockade, she was torpedoed and sunk on 19 March 1917 by a German U-boat, leaving 296 men dead. The location of the wreck remained a mystery until an underwater survey team inadvertently discovered the battleship in December 2007. In February 2009, the wreck was confirmed to be Danton. The ship is in remarkably good shape for her age. Danton rests upright on the ocean floor, and most of the original equipment is reported to be intact.

Design 

Although the s were a significant improvement from the preceding , especially with the 3,000-ton displacement increase, they were outclassed by the advent of the dreadnought well before they were completed. This, combined with other poor traits, including the great weight in coal they had to carry, made them rather unsuccessful ships, though their numerous rapid-firing guns were of some use in the Mediterranean.

She displaced  at full load and had a crew of 681 officers and enlisted men. She was powered by four Parsons steam turbines with twenty-six Belleville boilers, the first French warship to use turbines.

Dantons main battery consisted of four 305mm/45 Modèle 1906 guns (12-inch) mounted in two twin gun turrets, one forward and one aft. The secondary battery consisted of twelve 240mm/50 Modèle 1902 guns in twin turrets, three on either side of the ship. A number of smaller guns were carried for defense against torpedo boats. These included sixteen  L/65 guns and ten  guns. The ship was also armed with two  torpedo tubes. The conning tower also had 300 mm thick sides.

Service 

Danton was laid down at the Arsenal de Brest in February 1906. Her launching was scheduled for May 1909, but socialist activists prevented the ship from leaving the stocks, and so the launching was delayed until on 4 July 1909. After completing fitting-out work, she was commissioned into the French Navy on 1 June 1911. A week after she was completed, she was sent to the United Kingdom in honour of the Coronation of George V in 1911. Upon her return to France, Danton was to the 1st Battleship Squadron in April 1912, along with her five sister ships. Later that year, while off Hyères in the Mediterranean, Danton suffered an explosion in one of her gun turrets, which killed three men and injured several others. In 1913, the squadron was joined by the two powerful dreadnoughts Courbet and Jean Bart.

Danton served in World War I in the French Mediterranean Fleet. At the outbreak of the war in early August 1914, she was assigned to guard convoys bringing French soldiers from North Africa, to protect from attack by the German battlecruiser  and light cruiser , which were operating in the area. At the time, she remained in the 1st Battle Squadron alongside her sister ships, under the command of Vice Admiral Chocheprat. By 16 August, the French naval commander, Admiral de Lapeyrère, took the bulk of the French fleet from Malta to the entrance of the Adriatic to keep the Austro-Hungarian Navy bottled up.

Sinking 

The battleship was returning to duty from a refit in Toulon and was bound for the Greek island of Corfu to join the Allied blockade of the Strait of Otranto. Danton was carrying more men than normal, as many were crew members of other ships at Corfu, and had been zig-zagging to foil enemy submarines. The ship sank in 45 minutes; 806 men were rescued by the destroyer Massue and nearby patrol boats, but 296, including Captain Delage, went down with the ship. Massue attacked U-64 with depth charges, but the U-boat successfully evaded her attacker.

Discovery 
In February 2009, it was made public that in late 2007 the wreck of the ship was discovered "in remarkable condition" during an underwater survey between Italy and Algeria for the GALSI gas pipeline.

Footnotes

References 
 
 .
 
 
 
 
 
 
 
 
 
 
 

Online sources

External links 

 The wreck of the Danton on www.wrecksite.eu
 Video of wreck BBC
 Compressed version of video on original website 

Danton-class battleships
Ships built in France
1909 ships
Maritime incidents in 1917
Ships sunk by German submarines in World War I
World War I shipwrecks in the Mediterranean Sea
2007 archaeological discoveries